Monitor speaker may refer to:

 Loudspeakers built into a computer monitor
 Stage monitor system, loudspeakers facing the stage during a live performance
 Studio monitor, professional grade loudspeaker designed specifically for audio production and engineering

See also
Monitor (disambiguation)